Michael Harris is a Canadian author and journalist. His first book, The End of Absence: Reclaiming What We’ve Lost in a World of Constant Connection won the Governor General's Award for English-language non-fiction at the 2014 Governor General's Awards. It was also long-listed for both the RBC Charles Taylor Prize and the B.C. National Nonfiction Award. The End of Absence is a reported memoir about living through a "Gutenberg Moment." It is a portrait of the last generation in history to remember life before the Internet. By describing the constant connectivity of contemporary life, Harris explores the idea that lack and absence are actually human virtues being stripped from us.

Harris's argument about online life was extended in his second work, Solitude: In Pursuit of a Singular Life in a Crowded World, where he argues that solitude should be thought of as a resource that has been exploited and monetized by devices and platform technologies.

In 2021 Harris published a third book, All We Want: Building the Life We Cannot Buy, which describes the emergence of consumer culture and proposes a paradigm shift in the way we measure our lives as a climate emergency forces radical change.

Harris worked as an editor for Vancouver Magazine and Western Living, and his essays have appeared in Esquire, Wired, Salon, Huffington Post, The Globe and Mail, and The Walrus. His journalism has been nominated for both the Western Magazine Awards and the National Magazine Awards.

In 2012, he also published the young adult novel Homo, about a gay teenager struggling with coming out in high school.

References

External links
Michael Harris

1980 births
Writers from Vancouver
Living people
21st-century Canadian novelists
Canadian male novelists
Canadian non-fiction writers
Canadian magazine editors
Canadian magazine writers
Canadian writers of young adult literature
Canadian LGBT journalists
Canadian LGBT novelists
Canadian gay writers
Governor General's Award-winning non-fiction writers
21st-century Canadian male writers
Canadian male non-fiction writers
Canadian social commentators
Gay novelists
21st-century Canadian LGBT people